The 1966–67 NBA season was the Warriors' 21st in the NBA, fifth in the San Francisco Bay Area and among the most wildly successful in franchise history. They entered the season on the heels of a 35–45 record that barely failed to make the postseason cut. Led by All-Stars Rick Barry and Nate Thurmond, they surprised the basketball world with a Western Division title on the strength of a 44-37 record. They advanced to the NBA Finals, losing to the heavily favored Philadelphia 76ers in six games.

Offseason
In the 1966 offseason, the Warriors made three transactions, the first being made on June 7, when the team signed center Bill McGill. The veteran would not be on the team's final roster.
On September 1, the Warriors purchased swingman Bob Warlick from the Detroit Pistons. Warlick would spend two seasons with the team, averaging 8 points per game during his tenure.

On September 7, the Warriors pulled off one of the most fruitful in their history, sending guard Guy Rodgers to the expansion Chicago Bulls in return for guards Jim King and Jeff Mullins plus cash. The trade marked the end of Rodgers' eight-year tenure with the Warriors. After the trade, he would play for the Bulls, the Cincinnati Royals, and the Milwaukee Bucks. King would play with the Warriors for three complete seasons before being traded in the beginning of the season to the Cincinnati Royals. Mullins would stay with the team for ten seasons, retiring in 1976.

Draft picks

Roster

Regular season

Season standings

x – clinched playoff spot

Record vs. opponents

Game log

Playoffs

|- align="center" bgcolor="#ccffcc"
| 1
| March 21
| Los Angeles
| W 124–108
| Jim King (22)
| Nate Thurmond (20)
| King, Barry (6)
| Oakland–Alameda County Coliseum Arena11,106
| 1–0
|- align="center" bgcolor="#ccffcc"
| 2
| March 23
| @ Los Angeles
| W 113–102
| Rick Barry (26)
| Nate Thurmond (24)
| Nate Thurmond (7)
| Los Angeles Memorial Sports Arena11,335
| 2–0
|- align="center" bgcolor="#ccffcc"
| 3
| March 26
| Los Angeles
| W 122–115
| Rick Barry (37)
| Nate Thurmond (21)
| Rick Barry (7)
| Cow Palace5,845
| 3–0
|-

|- align="center" bgcolor="#ccffcc"
| 1
| March 30
| St. Louis
| W 117–115
| Rick Barry (38)
| Nate Thurmond (14)
| Jeff Mullins (7)
| Cow Palace7,813
| 1–0
|- align="center" bgcolor="#ccffcc"
| 2
| April 1
| St. Louis
| W 143–136
| Rick Barry (47)
| Nate Thurmond (17)
| Rick Barry (6)
| Cow Palace12,337
| 2–0
|- align="center" bgcolor="#ffcccc"
| 3
| April 5
| @ St. Louis
| L 109–115
| Rick Barry (31)
| Nate Thurmond (21)
| Jeff Mullins (6)
| Kiel Auditorium8,042
| 2–1
|- align="center" bgcolor="#ffcccc"
| 4
| April 8
| @ St. Louis
| L 104–109
| Jeff Mullins (40)
| Nate Thurmond (21)
| Jeff Mullins (4)
| Kiel Auditorium10,016
| 2–2
|- align="center" bgcolor="#ccffcc"
| 5
| April 10
| St. Louis
| W 123–102
| Rick Barry (25)
| Nate Thurmond (27)
| Fred Hetzel (6)
| Cow Palace10,311
| 3–2
|- align="center" bgcolor="#ccffcc"
| 6
| April 12
| @ St. Louis
| W 112–107
| Rick Barry (41)
| Nate Thurmond (21)
| Rick Barry (5)
| Kiel Auditorium8,004
| 4–2
|-

|- align="center" bgcolor="#ffcccc"
| 1
| April 14
| @ Philadelphia
| L 135–141 (OT)
| Rick Barry (37)
| Nate Thurmond (31)
| Rick Barry (7)
| Philadelphia Convention Hall9,283
| 0–1
|- align="center" bgcolor="#ffcccc"
| 2
| April 16
| @ Philadelphia
| W 95–126
| Rick Barry (30)
| Nate Thurmond (29)
| Jim King (6)
| Philadelphia Convention Hall9,426
| 0–2
|- align="center" bgcolor="#ccffcc"
| 3
| April 18
| Philadelphia
| W 130–124
| Rick Barry (55)
| Nate Thurmond (25)
| Jim King (6)
| Cow Palace14,773
| 1–2
|- align="center" bgcolor="#ffcccc"
| 4
| April 20
| Philadelphia
| L 108–122
| Rick Barry (43)
| Nate Thurmond (25)
| Nate Thurmond (5)
| Cow Palace15,117
| 1–3
|- align="center" bgcolor="#ccffcc"
| 5
| April 23
| @ Philadelphia
| W 117–109
| Rick Barry (36)
| Nate Thurmond (28)
| Al Attles (6)
| Philadelphia Convention Hall10,229
| 2–3
|- align="center" bgcolor="#ffcccc"
| 6
| April 24
| Philadelphia
| L 122–125
| Rick Barry (44)
| Nate Thurmond (22)
| Jim King (7)
| Cow Palace15,612
| 2–4
|-

Awards and records
 Rick Barry, NBA All-Star Game Most Valuable Player Award
 Rick Barry, NBA All-Star Game
 Nate Thurmond, NBA All-Star Game
 Rick Barry, NBA Scoring Champion
 Rick Barry, All-NBA First Team

References

Golden State Warriors seasons
San Francisco
San Fran
San Fran